Khalil Darfalou (born 21 May 2001) is an Algerian professional footballer who plays for USM Alger in the Algerian Ligue Professionnelle 1.

Career
On July 27, 2022, Khalil Darfalou signed a two-year contract with USM Alger.

Career statistics

Club

References

External links
 

Algerian footballers
ES Sétif players
USM Alger players
Association football forwards
Living people
2001 births
21st-century Algerian people